Luftwaffe is a generic German term for an air force. It may also refer to one of the following air forces:

 The Luftwaffe of Nazi Germany (1933–1945)
 The Luftwaffe of the Federal Republic of Germany (1956–present)
 The Schweizer Luftwaffe of Switzerland

See also
Luftstreitkräfte (disambiguation)